Ardent Leisure (formerly Macquarie Leisure Trust) is an Australian-based leisure company which owns and operates a leisure portfolio of over 100 assets across Australia, New Zealand and the United States. It is most known for its operation of the Dreamworld theme park and the WhiteWater World water park on the Gold Coast, Queensland, Australia.

History
Ardent Leisure was originally known as Macquarie Leisure Trust until it split from Macquarie Group in 2009. The company began by acquiring the existing Dreamworld theme park in 1998. In 2006, Ardent Leisure constructed a world-class water park, WhiteWater World. In 2009, Ardent Leisure acquired QDeck.

In April 2015 Deborah Thomas, former editor of  Cleo and other magazines, was appointed as chief executive officer (CEO) of Ardent Leisure. Thomas was replaced on 9 June 2017 when Simon Kelly was appointed as CEO and Managing Director (MD).

Portfolio

Ardent Leisure owns and operates over 100 leisure assets including theme parks, tourist attractions, bowling centres and laser skirmish centres across Australia, New Zealand and the United States.

Theme parks

Ardent Leisure began as the company which owned and operated the Dreamworld theme park on the Gold Coast. Dreamworld was acquired in July 1998 - within a month of its establishment. The theme park has over 30 rides, shows and attractions across a  park. In December 2006, an adjacent water park to Dreamworld opened. WhiteWater World features 14 different water attractions including some Australian firsts.

Main Event Entertainment 

Main Event Entertainment is a chain of family entertainment centers in the United States. Based out of Plano, Texas, the chain operates attractions including ten pin bowling, laser tag, games arcades, rock climbing, mini golf and ropes courses. Main Event operates 50 locations in 17 states.

In June 2020, RedBird Capital Partners acquired a 24.2% stake in Main Event. On 6 April 2022, competitor Dave & Buster's announced its intent to acquire Main Event from Ardent and RedBird for US$835 million (A$1.1 billion); Main Event CEO Chris Morris was retained, and made CEO of the combined company.

Thunder River Rapids Ride incident 

On 25 October 2016, four people were killed at the Dreamworld theme park owned by Ardent. The Thunder River Rapids Ride they were travelling on malfunctioned and they were thrown onto a flooded conveyor belt.

Criticism was initially levelled when it was proposed to partially re-open Dreamworld for a memorial event, with proceeds going to the Australian Red Cross, on 28 October. This was later cancelled to allow investigations into the incident to continue unimpeded. Dreamworlds CEO Craig Davidson later said that it would not reopen till at least after all four funerals were held. This was decided by Ardent CEO Deborah Thomas.

By coincidence Ardent's annual general meeting (AGM) was scheduled for 27 October, two days after the accident. During the meeting CEO Deborah Thomas was criticised for not having directly contacted all the families of those killed. She was also criticised over her bonuses, totalling about $850,000, which were voted on at the AGM. Thomas later said that she would give the cash component of her yearly bonus, equalling , to the Red Cross "... to support people affected by this tragic event".

The findings of the Coroner's report (by Queensland south-eastern coroner James McDougall) were released on 24 February 2020.

On 21 July 2020, Ardent announced to the Australian Stock Exchange that three charges had been laid against Ardent. The charges were filed by the Work Health and Safety prosecutor, under the Work Health and Safety Act, at the Brisbane Magistrates Court.
On 29 July 2020, Dreamworld operator Ardent Leisure pleaded guilty to three charges relating to the death of four people on the Thunder River Rapids Ride. In the Southport Magistrates Court on 28 September, Magistrate Pam Dowse sentenced Ardent Leisure to a  fine.

See also
 Dreamworld
 SkyPoint Observation Deck
 WhiteWater World

References

External links
 Ardent Leisure
 Dreamworld
 Main Event
 AMF Laser Tag
 SkyPoint
 WhiteWater World

 
Amusement park companies
Companies based in Sydney
Entertainment companies established in 1998
Companies listed on the Australian Securities Exchange
Australian companies established in 1998